The National Digital Newspaper Program is a joint project between the National Endowment for the Humanities and the Library of Congress to create and maintain a publicly available, online digital archive of historically significant newspapers published in the United States between 1836 and 1922.  Additionally, the program will make available bibliographic records and holdings information for some 140,000 newspaper titles from the 17th century to the present.  Further, it will include scope notes and encyclopedia-style entries discussing the historical significance of specific newspapers. Added content will also include contextually relevant historical information. "One organization within each U.S. state or territory will receive an award to collaborate with relevant state partners in this effort." In March 2007 more than 226,000 pages of newspapers from California, Florida, Kentucky, New York, Utah, Virginia and the District of Columbia published between 1900 and 1910 were put online at a fully searchable site called "Chronicling America." As of December 2007, the total number of pages is about 413,000. This further expanded to be 1 million pages in 2009. Funding through the National Endowment for the Humanities is carried out through their "We The People" initiative.

Purpose 
This project dovetails with the United States Newspaper Program which was a massive project to microfilm newspaper collections. The initiators of that earlier project asserted that the intellectual content of newspapers serves an important role for researchers as it is for all intents and purposes the first draft of history. Newspapers also provide unique access to "diverse geographic viewpoints at the community level." Problematically, since the middle of the 19th century this "first draft" has been recorded on poor quality newsprint which is decaying rapidly. This digitization project's purpose is to continue preserving newspaper and newspaper collections while addressing the inadequacies of the prior program. Through digitization, it is more likely that images will be copied with fidelity and that the records will be more richly searchable. This latter point is huge as newspapers traditionally posed a research challenge due to density of text and inadequate cataloging of content.

History 
On March 31, 2004, Bruce Cole, the directory of the NEH, and James Billington, the Librarian of Congress, signed an agreement creating the National Digital Newspaper Program.  The NDNP follows in the footsteps of the successful United States Newspaper Program, a several-decade effort to catalog and microfilm the bulk of America's historic newspapers. The program is broken down into two phases. Each successive phase will both increase the scope of the program and refine the requirements for data collection.

Phase 1 
In July 2004 the award guidelines were issued. Applications were due in October and awardees were announced the following March. The first phase took newspapers from a small subset of the states, limited to 1900 through 1910.  After using this phase to improve technical requirements and specifications, the program was opened to other awardees in Phase 2.

The awardees for Phase 1 are:
 University of California, Riverside
 University of Florida Libraries, Gainesville
 University of Kentucky Libraries, Lexington
 New York Public Library, New York City
 University of Utah, Salt Lake City
 Library of Virginia, Richmond

The General-access Phase 1 website prototype was implemented in March 2007 and that May it was announced that phase 1 was completed.

Phase 2 
Phase 2 of NDNP expanded grants to an additional group of institutions. Awards granted in 2007 and 2008 included the following institutions:

 Arizona State Library, Archives and Records Management
 University of Hawaii
 Minnesota Historical Society
 University of Nebraska, Lincoln
 University of North Texas
 Ohio Historical Society, Columbus
 Pennsylvania State University
 State Historical Society of Missouri
 Washington State Library

Program Technology 
Participants must follow the technical guidelines laid out in a 64-page PDF. The technology for the NDNP digital repository is being built using largely open source software, including:

 Apache Cocoon
 Apache Lucene
 Gentoo Linux
 Fedora
Digital objects are stored in .TIFF 6.0, .JPEG 2000, and .PDF formats. Metadata is provided in the METS/MODS version of XML and XML provides the basis for larger hierarchical structures as well.

Alternatives 
The scanning efforts of the government entity have been dwarfed by newspapers.com and newspaperarchive.com which as of March 2018 claim to each have scanned more than 350 million pages.  Publishers, libraries and historical organizations find the private sector faster, less complicated and cheaper than the National Digital Newspaper Program. Both private organizations charge readers to read, but do not charge publishers to scan items.

See also
United States Newspaper Program
Trove

References

External links 
National Endowment for the Humanities
Library of Congress
New York Public Library
Bruce Cole introducing the NDNP to the Organization of America Historians
Utah Digital Newspapers
Chronicling America
Florida Digital Newspaper Library
Florida & Puerto Rico Digital Newspaper Project
Texas Digital Newspaper Collections
Newspapercat: a catalog of digitized historical newspapers.

Archives in the United States
Newspapers published in the United States
Library of Congress
National Endowment for the Humanities
Joint ventures
Historic newspaper digitization projects